Lina Marín (died June 23, 1989) was a Mexican actress of Zapotec descent, known for her performance in A Man Called Horse (1970) and for her starring role opposite Gaspar Henaine "Capulina" in El bueno para nada (1973).

Biography
Marín was born Felipa Cartas Orozco in the region of the Isthmus of Tehuantepec, in the municipality of Unión Hidalgo, Oaxaca. At age 14 she moved to Mexico City, where she began her acting career with a small role in the drama film El derecho de nacer in 1966.

She had prominent supporting roles in La marcha a Zacatecas and El último pistolero (both 1969) before playing a Sioux Indian named Thorn Rose in A Man Called Horse (1970), the film that gave her international exposure.

She also acted in Espérame en Siberia, vida mía (1971), with Mauricio Garcés; Chanoc contra el tigre y el vampiro (1972), with Gregorio Casal; Tacos al carbon (1972), with Vicente Fernández; El rey de Acapulco (1972), with Capulina; and El Payo - un hombre contra el mundo (1972), with Jorge Rivero.

Her greatest achievement in Mexican cinema was her performance in her second film co-starring Capulina, El bueno para nada (1973), in which she played the main female role: María, Capulina's Native Mexican girlfriend who works as a maid in the house of Susana Alexander and Pancho Córdova. Her performance showed that, in addition to being a great beauty, she also had talent for comedy.

She returned to acting in the mid-1980s with a supporting role in the film Lo que importa es vivir (1987).

She died of breast cancer on June 23, 1989 and is survived by two children.

Legacy
A movie theater in the Herón Ríos Cultural Center in Juchitán de Zaragoza bears her name.

In 2016, she was honored with a mural and a short film in Unión Hidalgo, her hometown.

Selected filmography

References

External links

1989 deaths
20th-century Mexican actresses
Actresses from Oaxaca
Deaths from breast cancer
Mexican film actresses
Zapotec people
Year of birth missing
Indigenous Mexican women
20th-century Native Americans